Jonas Björkman defeated Byron Black 6–3, 6–2 in the final to secure the title.

Seeds

Draw

Finals

Section 1

Section 2

External links
 1998 Nottingham Open Singles draw

Singles